Ravi Kumar or Ravikumar is Hindu given name, which means "Son of the Sun", combining the Sanskrit words "Ravi" (Sun) and "Kumar" (Son). The name may refer to:

Film
 Ravikumar (actor), Indian actor in Malayalam movies during the 1970s and 1980s
 K. S. Ravikumar (born 1958), Indian film director and actor
 R. Ravi Kumar, Indian director of Indru Netru Naalai

Sports
 Ravi Kumar (sport shooter) (born 1990), Indian sport shooter
 Ravi Kumar (footballer) (born 1993), Indian footballer
 Ravi Kumar Dahiya, Indian wrestler
 Ravi Kumar Punia (born February 1993), Indian footballer, defender

Other
 Ravi Kumar (Pakistani politician), in Khyber Pakhtunkhwa 
 R. Ravi Kumar, Indian surgeon
 Matta Ravikumar (died 2006), also known as Ravi Kumar, leader of the Communist Party of India (Maoist)